This article documents the discography for American guitarist Leo Kottke.

Albums

Studio albums

Collaborations

Live albums

Compilation albums

Soundtracks

References

 
Discographies of American artists